Shobha Bhagawati is a holy shrine devoted to the goddess Bhagawati on the bank of the Bisnumati River in Kathmandu, Nepal. It is considered to be one of the most revered holy places in Kathmandu. There is a statue of the goddess inside the temple. It is one of holy place where devotees come to worship goddess Durga which they think brings happiness, joy in their life. As it is located in Kathmandu many people mostly visit there in great festival Dashain.

References

Hindu temples in Kathmandu District
Bhagavathi temples